Sex is a Four Letter Word is a 1995 Australian film directed by Murray Fahey and starring Joy Smithers, Miranda Otto, Mark Lee, Tessa Humphries and Rhett Walton.

It has been described as an Australian version of The Big Chill (1983).

Premise
A love columnist (Joy Smithers) invites six friends over to talk about love and sex.

References

External links

Sex is a Four Letter Word at Screen Australia

Australian comedy-drama films
1995 films
Films directed by Murray Fahey
1990s English-language films
1995 comedy-drama films
1990s Australian films